Cyrene may refer to:

Antiquity
 Cyrene (mythology), an ancient Greek mythological figure
 Cyrene, Libya, an ancient Greek colony in North Africa (modern Libya)
 Crete and Cyrenaica, a province of the Roman Empire
 Cyrenaica, the region around the city
 Cyrenaics, an ancient Greek school of philosophy

Modern-day places
 Cyrene, Georgia, a community in the United States
 Cyrene, Missouri, a community in the United States

Games and TV fiction
 Cyrene (Xena: Warrior Princess), a fictional character in the television series Xena: Warrior Princess
 Cyrene (Creative Kingdom), a setting in the online game Entropia Universe

Ships
 Cyrene (steamboat), a steamboat that ran on Puget Sound and Lake Washington, 1891–1912
 , a sailing frigate of the Royal Navy, sold in 1828 at Bombay
 , a 1944 motor torpedo boat tender

Science
 133 Cyrene, an asteroid
 a synonym for Nycerella, a genus of spiders
 Cyrene, a trade name for dihydrolevoglucosenone

See also
 Cyren (disambiguation)
 Kyrene School District, a K-8 school district in Maricopa County, Arizona